Trevor Bowen Walters (13 January 1916 – 1 June 1989) was a Welsh footballer, who played as a centre half in the Football League for Chester.

References

Chester City F.C. players
Caernarfon Town F.C. managers
Caernarfon Town F.C. players
Aberaman Athletic F.C. players
Association football central defenders
English Football League players
1989 deaths
1916 births
Footballers from Aberdare
Welsh footballers
Welsh football managers